Slick may refer to:

People
 Slick (wrestling) (born 1957), American former professional wrestling manager
 Slick (nickname)
 Slick (surname)

Musicians
 Slick Aguilar (born 1954), American guitarist
 Ricky Bell (singer) (born 1967), a.k.a. Slick, R&B singer
 Slick Rick (born 1965), rapper
 Darby Slick (born 1944), American guitarist and songwriter
 Earl Slick (born 1952), American rock guitarist
 Eric Slick (born 1987), American singer, songwriter and drummer
 Grace Slick (born 1939), singer
 Mitchy Slick (born 1978), rapper
 Sgt Slick, DJ in Melbourne, Australia

Arts, entertainment and media

Fictional characters
 Slick (comics), two different characters in the Marvel Universe
 Slick, the final boss in the video game River City Ransom
 Slick, one of the main characters in the webcomic Sinfest
 Sam Slick, a character created by Thomas Chandler Haliburton, a Canadian judge and author
 Soapy Slick, saloon operator and profiteer in the Scrooge McDuck comic series
 Tom Slick, the title character of the TV series Tom Slick

Other arts, entertainment and media
 Slick (album), a 1977 album by Eddie Kendricks
 Slick (magazine format), an upmarket format for magazines indicating they were printed on high quality paper
 "Slick", the second episode of the TV series Birds of Prey
 "Slick", a song by Joe Satriani from The Electric Joe Satriani: An Anthology

Transportation
 Bell UH-1 Iroquois, a military helicopter nicknamed Slick
 Slick Airways, an American charter and scheduled freight airline
 Slick tire, used in motor racing

Other uses
 Slick, Oklahoma, a US town
 Slick (tool), a large woodworking chisel
 KCNT2 (symbol SLICK), a human gene
 Slick (hiding place), used by militant Zionist groups in Mandatory Palestine to hide weapons

See also
 SLIC (disambiguation)
 Slick chick (disambiguation)
 Slick Willie (disambiguation)
 Slik (disambiguation)